Kokot may refer to:
 Kokot, Poland, a village in Gmina Kije, Pińczów County, Świętokrzyskie Voivodeship, Poland
 Kokot (castle), formerly a castle in present-day Slovakia
 Kokot (magazine), a defunct Croatian magazine
 Kokot (surname)
 Kokot, formerly a tower of South Bohemian castle Choustník - see List of castles in the South Bohemian Region
 Orsi

See also